The Developer Transition Kit is the name of two prototype Mac computers made available to software developers by Apple Inc. The first Developer Transition Kit was made available in 2005 prior to the Mac transition to Intel processors to aid in the Mac's transition from PowerPC to an Intel-based x86-64 architecture. A second Developer Transition Kit was made available in 2020 prior to the Mac transition to Apple silicon as part of its initiative to transition the Mac away from Intel to Apple's ARM64-based Apple silicon.

Intel Developer Transition Kit (2005) 

During Apple's 2005–2006 transition from PowerPC to Intel processors, the company made available the first Developer Transition Kit (DTK), a prototype Intel-based Mac computer for developers. 

During Apple's 2005 Worldwide Developers Conference, then-CEO Steve Jobs emphasized the non-commercial nature of the prototype hardware: "This is a development platform only. This is not a product; this will never be shipped as a product. It’s just for you guys to get started in development. You actually have to return them by the end of 2006. We don’t want them floating around out there. These are not products."

The computer identified itself as "Apple Development Platform" (ADP2,1), and consisted of a 3.6 GHz Intel Pentium 4 processor, 1 GB DDR2 RAM, 160 GB SATA hard disk drive, and optical disk drive in a Power Mac G5 case slightly modified with an altered cooling system. Connectivity included USB 2.0, FireWire 400, and Gigabit Ethernet. Software included Xcode 2.1 and a version of Mac OS X 10.4.1 which runs on Intel's x86 architecture.

The Intel DTK was available to software developers on a loan basis, and Apple required developers to return the prototype computers to the company within a week of December 31, 2006. Apple required developers to be a Select or Premier Apple Developer Connect (ADC) member, with memberships starting at 499 per year and additional requirement to pay 999 to receive an Intel DTK. Apple then offered developers a free Intel-based iMac in exchange for sending back the DTK. The Intel DTK would be directly succeeded by the first-generation Mac Pro.

Apple Silicon Developer Transition Kit (2020)

Specifications 

At the 2020 Worldwide Developers Conference, on June 22, 2020, Apple announced another Developer Transition Kit (DTK) intended to assist software developers during the transition of the Mac platform to the ARM architecture. Described informally as "an iPad in a Mac mini’s body," the DTK carries a model number of A2330 and identifies itself as "Apple Development Platform." It consisted of an A12Z processor, 16 GB RAM, 512 GB SSD, and a variety of common I/O ports (USB-C, USB-A, HDMI 2.0, and Gigabit Ethernet) in a Mac mini case. Support for wireless communication based upon Wi-Fi 5 (802.11ac) and Bluetooth 5.0 was included, while Thunderbolt 3 support, built-in to every Mac commercially available as of June 2020, was not included. It eventually appeared in the first three models of Apple silicon Macs, operating in Thunderbolt 3/USB4 mode. The DTK came preloaded with beta versions of macOS 11 Big Sur. The A12Z DTK would be directly succeeded by the 2020 Mac mini with the M1 processor.

Performance 
In an interview shortly after the introduction of the DTK, Apple’s SVP of Software Engineering Craig Federighi praised the DTK's performance and contributed to expectations of superlative performance of forthcoming commercial products based upon Apple silicon custom-engineered for the Macintosh platform: “Even that DTK hardware, which is running on an existing iPad chip that we don’t intend to put in a Mac in the future – it’s just there for the transition – the Mac runs awfully nice on that system. It’s not a basis on which to judge future Macs ... but it gives you a sense of what our silicon team can do when they’re not even trying – and they’re going to be trying.”

Conditions of use 
To receive a DTK, developers needed to sign up for a one year membership to Apple's Universal App Quick Start Program, at a cost of 500.
The membership to this program came with a couple of benefits, such as code-level technical support, access to one-on-one labs with Apple engineers and a license to use a DTK made available by Apple, effectively giving access to the DTK on a loan basis.

The device had to be returned to Apple one year after joining the Universal App Quick Start Program, "or as otherwise earlier requested by Apple". 
Several conditions of use were attached, including restrictions against disassembling the computer, running unauthorized benchmark tests, or using it for work other than transition-related software development.

Controversy 

The terms of the Universal App Quick Start Program indicated that the program would run for the duration of one year counted from the moment the developer signed up for it, with an option to terminate it early without reason. Additionally, it had a specific provision regarding one of the benefits associated with the program, namely the DTK. The DTK was to be returned within 30 days after the end of the program itself or "as otherwise earlier requested by Apple". Apple had earlier communicated that the DTK was meant to prepare for the launch of Macs based on Apple silicon, thereby suggesting that the Program would be available until the new Apple silicon Macs would be available.

In February 2021 Apple emailed the developers regarding the early return of the DTK while keeping the rest of the program and its benefits active until the original expiration of one year. Additionally, Apple indicated in their email that they would provide a discount code for a 200 discount towards the purchase of a Mac with M1 after the DTK was returned. This discount code wasn't promised beforehand or part of the original agreement but was considered as a compensation in exchange of an early return.

Some developers reacted with criticism to the email. Among them were developers that voiced their unhappiness about their experience with the DTK. Apple wrote in the description of the Program that the "Developer Transition Kit [was] not fully tested and [was] to be used only for limited testing and development purposes" and that the DTK "may contain errors that could cause failures or loss of data". However developers complained that the DTK was showing much more issues than a normal user would expected, making it "unusable" in development. Others were under the impression that they could use the DTK for a full year, being caught in surprise by Apple's email indicating that they soon had to return the DTK. Many were also indicating that they were unhappy about the 200 discount code offered by Apple, comparing it to when Apple unexpectedly offered developers the option to return their Intel DTK earlier than the originally planned date for an iMac during the transition from PowerPC to Intel processors. During the last transition, a developer could also choose to keep the DTK for the whole length of the program except that they would not get the iMac.

On February 5, 2021, following developer backlash, Apple sent out another email that increased the discount code to US$500 and expanded the discount to be used on any other Apple devices. In addition, the code expired at the end of 2021, instead of May.

Specifications

References

External links 
 Apple's announcement of DTK introduction as part of Mac transition to Apple silicon
 Official technical specifications

x86 Macintosh computers
ARM Macintosh computers
Computer-related introductions in 2005
Computer-related introductions in 2020